Boyuk Jeddikar (3 February 1929 – 18 December 2013) was an Iranian footballer.

He is known for being the first footballer in Iranian football history to be transferred from an Iranian club to a foreign club.

Club career
Jedikar first started playing in the position of goalkeeper. His talent of using the left-foot was discovered by coach Ali Danaeifard who suggested that Jeddikar should move upfront and play as a left striker. This discovery paid off and Jeddikar soon became one of the best footballers in the country.

In 1957, he was transferred to Viktoria 89 Berlin on a three-year contract with a 1500 Deutschmarks a month salary, however his time in Germany was shortened when his father died, so after only 9 months Jeddikar returned to Iran to resume his career with Taj SC (currently Esteghlal).

Prior to Jeddikar's transfer, past Iranian footballers only had played outside Iran whilst they were studying abroad such as Hossein Sadaghiani (Belgium, Turkey and Austria), Hossein-Ali Khan Sardar (Belgium and Switzerland), Ahmad-Ali Khan Sardar (Belgium), Khan Khanan (Belgium) and Masoud Boroumand (United States and Lebanon) were all footballers studying and playing abroad. Jedikar's transfer to Germany paved the way for future footballers such as Parviz Koozehkanani, Hamid Shirzadegan and Mohammad Reza Adelkhani.

International career
At the age of 17 he was selected for Tehran XI.  However his first national cap was versus Afghanistan in 1950 and his last cap was versus Turkey in 1965.

References

 Tebyan Interview Part1
 Tebyan Interview Part2
 Assyrian Sports Club

Iranian footballers
Iran international footballers
Association football forwards
Esteghlal F.C. players
Expatriate footballers in Germany
Iranian expatriate footballers
Sportspeople from Tabriz
1929 births
2013 deaths
Footballers at the 1958 Asian Games
Asian Games competitors for Iran